Ismael Diaz may refer to:

Ismael Díaz (footballer, born 1990), Dominican footballer
Ismael Díaz (footballer, born 1997), Panamanian footballer
Ismael Díaz (Salvadoran footballer) (died 1976), Salvadoran footballer
Ismael Díaz (football manager) (born 1965), Spanish football manager